Sardar Mahal is a palace located in Hyderabad, Telangana.

History 
Sardar Mahal was built in European style by Nizam VI Mir Mahboob Ali Khan in 1900 for one of his consorts Sardar Begum. As Sardar Begum did not like the construction, she never stayed there. However, the building was named after her. Greater Hyderabad Municipal Corporation took over the Sardar Mahal in 1965 due to outstanding property taxes. The palace is to be converted into a museum. It was declared as a heritage building by the Heritage Conservation Committee and INTACH.

Cultural Hub 

This palace is currently undergoing restoration and renovation and very soon a Cultural Center would be started here by Kalakriti India.

References

Hyderabad State
Heritage structures in Hyderabad, India
Tourist attractions in Hyderabad, India
Royal residences in India
Palaces in Hyderabad, India
Palaces of Nizams of Hyderabad